Cesare Zoppetti (January 1, 1876 – March 15, 1940) was an Italian stage and film actor. Zoppetti was a prolific film actor of the 1930s, appearing in nearly fifty productions between 1930 and his death in 1940 including the comedy What Scoundrels Men Are! (1932).

Selected filmography

 The Private Secretary (1931)
 Television (1931)
 What Scoundrels Men Are! (1932).
 The Table of the Poor (1932)
 Your Money or Your Life (1932)
 The Blue Fleet (1932)
 The Gift of the Morning (1932)
 The Last Adventure (1932)
 Tourist Train (1933)
 Seconda B (1934)
 The Old Guard (1934)
 1860 (1934)
 Mr. Desire (1934)
 The Wedding March (1934)
 Three Cornered Hat (1935)
 The Wedding March (1936)
 I'll Give a Million (1936)
 Bayonet (1936)
 Joe the Red (1936)
 The Dance of Time (1936)
 The Ambassador (1936)
 The Former Mattia Pascal (1937)
 Departure (1938)
 Princess Tarakanova (1938)
 Tonight at Eleven (1938)
 The Widow (1939)
 Backstage (1939)
 Who Are You? (1939)
 The Fornaretto of Venice (1939)
 The Count of Brechard (1940)

References

Bibliography
 Landy, Marcia. The Folklore of Consensus: Theatricality in the Italian Cinema, 1930-1943. SUNY Press, 1998.

External links

1876 births
1940 deaths
Italian male film actors
Italian male stage actors
Actors from Genoa
20th-century Italian male actors